Studená Vltava is a river of Germany (Bavaria) and the Czech Republic (South Bohemian Region). It connects with the Teplá Vltava to form the Vltava. The confluence is located in Pěkná (an exclave of Nová Pec), near Volary.

See also
List of rivers of Bavaria
List of rivers of the Czech Republic

References

Rivers of Bavaria
Rivers of the South Bohemian Region
Bohemian Forest
Rivers of Germany
International rivers of Europe